"Addicted" is a song written by Cheryl Wheeler, first recorded in 1986. It was later recorded by American country music artist Dan Seals and released as the lead single for his 1988 album Rage On. It peaked at number one, and was his eighth consecutive number-one single. Blake Shelton covered the song as a bonus track on his 2011 album Red River Blue.

Charts

Weekly charts

Year-end charts

References

1988 singles
Dan Seals songs
Blake Shelton songs
Song recordings produced by Kyle Lehning
Capitol Records Nashville singles
1986 songs
Songs written by Cheryl Wheeler